North Shore is a parliamentary electorate that returns one Member of Parliament to the New Zealand House of Representatives. The current MP for North Shore is Simon Watts of the National Party, who at the 2020 election was elected to succeed the retiring Maggie Barry, also of National.

Population centres
The 1941 New Zealand census had been postponed due to World War II, so the 1946 electoral redistribution had to take ten years of population growth and movements into account. The North Island gained a further two electorates from the South Island due to faster population growth. The abolition of the country quota through the Electoral Amendment Act, 1945 reduced the number and increased the size of rural electorates. None of the existing electorates remained unchanged, 27 electorates were abolished, eight former electorates were re-established, and 19 electorates were created for the first time, including North Shore.

No boundary adjustments were undertaken in the subsequent redistributions in 2002, 2007, and 2013/14.

North Shore stretches up the eastern coast of North Shore City in Auckland, starting in the south at Devonport and moving northwards to take in Lake Pupuke and the suburbs of Takapuna, Westlake and Campbells Bay. North Shore is predominantly New Zealand European, and has an average income high above the national average, boasting some of the most expensive real estate in the country.

History

The seat has been contested at every election in New Zealand since 1946, and except for a single victory by future Labour Attorney-General Martyn Finlay in its first contest, has been safely held by the National Party ever since.

Wayne Mapp held the electorate from  until his retirement in 2011.

Members of Parliament
Unless otherwise stated, all MPs terms began and started at general elections.

Key

List MPs
Members of Parliament elected from party lists in elections where that person also unsuccessfully contested the North Shore electorate. Unless otherwise stated, all MPs terms began and ended at general elections.

Election results

2020 election

2017 election

2014 election

2011 election

Electorate (as at 26 November 2011): 48,963

2008 election

2005 election

1999 election
Refer to Candidates in the New Zealand general election 1999 by electorate#North Shore for a list of candidates.

1996 election

1993 election

1990 election

1987 election

1984 election

1981 election

1978 election

1975 election

1972 election

1969 election

1966 election

1963 election

1960 election

1957 election

1954 election

1951 election

1949 election

1946 election

Table footnotes

Notes

References

External links
Electorate Profile  Parliamentary Library

New Zealand electorates in the Auckland Region
Politics of the Auckland Region
1946 establishments in New Zealand